Little Heath is a suburb of the town of Reading, in the county of Berkshire, England. It is part of the larger suburb of Tilehurst (where according to the grid ref the majority of the 2011 Census population  was included), forming the south western flank of that suburb and bordering on open countryside to its west.

Government
Little Heath is within that part of Tilehurst, sometimes known as Tilehurst Without, that lies outside the borough boundaries of Reading. It therefore lies within the civil parish of Tilehurst in the area of the unitary authority of West Berkshire.

Like the rest of Tilehurst, Little Heath falls within the Reading West constituency of the UK Parliament. Prior to Brexit in 2020, it was represented by the South East England constituency for the European Parliament.

School
Little Heath is the home of Little Heath School, a voluntary aided co-educational comprehensive secondary school that serves the local area on both sides of the borough boundary.

References

Suburbs of Reading, Berkshire
West Berkshire District
Tilehurst